Denis Jon Hickey (born 31 December 1964) is a former Australian first class cricketer who played for Victoria and South Australia in the Sheffield Shield. A right arm fast bowler, he spent the 1986 English summer playing with Glamorgan after receiving a cricket scholarship.

The closest he came to playing for Australia was a tour of Zimbabwe in 1991 with Australia A.

Since his cricketing days he has carved out a successful corporate career and was CEO of ING Real Estate in Sydney, then Lendlease's global COO and chief executive of Americas until 2022.

References 

1964 births
Living people
Australian cricketers
South Australia cricketers
Victoria cricketers
Glamorgan cricketers
Melbourne Cricket Club cricketers
Cricketers from Victoria (Australia)
Australian real estate businesspeople
People from Mooroopna